Agonorites is a genus of beetles in the family Carabidae, containing the following species:

 Agonorites anacritus Basilewsky, 1985
 Agonorites anchomeninus (Alluaud, 1932)
 Agonorites ankaratrae (Jeannel, 1948)
 Agonorites antsifotrae Basilewsky, 1985
 Agonorites culminicola Basilewsky, 1985
 Agonorites descarpentriesi Basilewsky, 1985
 Agonorites griveaudi Basilewsky, 1985
 Agonorites jeanneli Basilewsky, 1985
 Agonorites microphthalmus (Jeannel, 1948)
 Agonorites montanus Basilewsky, 1985
 Agonorites pauliani Basilewsky, 1985

References

Platyninae